The Beginning is the sixth studio album by American group the Black Eyed Peas. The album was released on November 26, 2010 by Interscope. It is a prequel to the group's previous album The E.N.D. (2009) and their last credited as the Black Eyed Peas (with a 'the' prefix). The lead single, "The Time (Dirty Bit)", was released on November 9, 2010. The second single was "Just Can't Get Enough" and it was released on February 18, 2011. The final single was "Don't Stop the Party" and was released on June 24, 2011. The album debuted at number six on the US Billboard 200 chart, with first-week sales of 119,000 copies. The Beginning was the final Black Eyed Peas album to feature Fergie as a member of the group, as well as the last before the group's five year hiatus.

Background 
On June 6, 2010, the band confirmed that they were working on a new album in an interview for The Big Issue. The album was described as a sequel to The E.N.D. will.i.am announced that the new album, which "symbolizes growth, new beginnings, and starts a fresh new perspective," would be titled The Beginning and be released on November 30, 2010. The album was officially announced in a press release on October 26, 2010.

Some songs were made available as promotional singles for the album release. The first, "Do It Like This", was released on November 15, 2010, and the second, "Light Up the Night", on November 22, 2010. The Beginning was one of Oprah's Favorite Things for 2010, and members of Oprah's audience were given copies of the album 11 days before its official release.

A tour called The Beginning Massive Stadium Tour began in June 2011 in France and ended in November 2011 with a total of 20 shows.

Singles 
"The Time (Dirty Bit)" was released as the lead single from The Beginning on November 5, 2010. It officially debuted on United States radio on November 16, 2010. The music video for "The Time (Dirty Bit)" was released on November 23, 2010 and was directed by Rich Lee, who had previously directed the video for "Rock That Body" and "Imma Be". The song topped the charts in more than 15 countries.
"Just Can't Get Enough" was released as the album's second single when it impacted US mainstream on February 8, 2011. It was announced on January 21, 2011 via Twitter and their official site that it would become a single. The music video for "Just Can't Get Enough" was directed by Ben Mor. It was shot over a three-day period in Tokyo just one week before the 2011 Tōhoku earthquake and tsunami. The song topped the charts in many countries.
"Don't Stop the Party" was announced as the third single from The Beginning by will.i.am on May 9, 2011. A music video for the song was released on iTunes the next day, along with the single. The video, which is directed by Ben Mor, features on stage and backstage footage of the group during their 'The E.N.D World Tour' throughout 2009 and 2010.

Promotional singles 
"Do It Like This", was released on November 16, 2010 worldwide and on November 26 on iTunes. It was the first promotional single from the album as part of "The Countdown to The Beginning".
"Light Up the Night" was the second promotional single from the album and was released on November 24, 2010 worldwide and on November 26 on iTunes. The song charted at number 99 at the Canadian Hot 100.

Other notable songs 
"Love You Long Time" had charted, at the first week after the album's release, at number 36 on the UK Dance Chart.
"Someday" had charted in 2011. The first was featured in the 2010 film Knight and Day and charted at number 80 on the Canadian Hot 100 and the second at number 16 on the French Singles Chart.
"Whenever" also serves as the fourth single from the album in France, and is used to promote the album in TV spots.

Critical reception 

The Beginning received generally mixed reviews from most music critics. The album was praised for its production, but it was heavily criticized by the lack of appearance of Fergie, will.i.am's vocals, use of Auto-Tune, and lyrics. At Metacritic, which assigns a normalized rating out of 100 to reviews from mainstream critics, the album received an average score of 47, based on 19 reviews, which indicates "mixed or average reviews".

Monica Herrera wrote for Billboard that "the music is expertly produced, but problems arise when Will.i.am claims the same of his wordplay. On the track "Don't Stop the Party," he chest-thumps, "Kill you with my lyricals/Call me verbal criminal." It's a silly boast for an artist who clearly focuses on beats over rhymes, and is probably better off for it." Kevin O'Donnell of Spin described the album as "one of the year's wildest sonic stews" and concluded "Pop's reigning peddlers of dumb fun are actually starting to sound stylishly avant-garde on their sixth album." The Guardians Caroline Sullivan gave the album 3 out of 5 stars calling it "upscale hip-pop" and said that "the Black Eyed Peas have created an album similar to 2009's enormously successful The END, but with more Auto-Tune and less input from the wonderful Fergie." Rolling Stone reviewer Jon Dolan viewed that the album "largely picks up where The E.N.D. left off" and felt that "they give themselves over more fully than ever to the groove palette of club culture, stirring up electro funk, Euro-trance and classic disco." John Bush of Allmusic gave the album 3 out of 5 stars, and noted that although David Guetta only appears on one track "his production job for 2009’s “I Gotta Feeling” casts a long shadow on this record of don't-stop-the-party jams and club-life tracks."

Entertainment Weekly writer Simon Vozick-Levinson gave the album a very positive review and stated "The Beginning wisely sticks with the heavier electronic beats they began importing from European clubs for The E.N.D. — a key ingredient that transformed the Black Eyed Peas from merely major stars to arguably the biggest chart act going [...] Every song is piled high with sticky pop melodies, slick hip-hop rhythms, bright synth parts, and vocals that have been diced and processed to high heaven, all furthering the goal of maximum catchiness." Greg Kot of Chicago Tribune gave the album 1.5 out of 4 stars and called it "the quartet’s tamest, most hook-deprived album in the Fergie era" and stated "the music’s reliance on rhythmic and lyrical repetition (as opposed to progression and surprise) becomes wearying." In his review for The Independent, Andy Gill gave it three out of five stars and wrote "It's a textbook blend of the over-familiar and the electronically treated, though their use of auto-tune and digital-stutter vocal effects is a touch more restrained than usual. From there on, the aspect never extends beyond the dancefloor, with martial synth-stomp riffs, spartan electro beats and loping bass grooves driving tracks." Ben Ratliff of The New York Times gave the album a negative review and noted it similarities with its predecessor, The E.N.D. with few differences, "less of Fergie’s actressy, un-Autotuned belting (too bad about that), bolder two-step techno beats, more heavily draped synthesizer tones and a fascination with late ’70s and early ’80s pop radio." and found the lyrics "soggy" and "cynical." musicOMH writer Luke Winkie stated that "will.i.am's productions sound like the bare minimum one could throw together and call a beat, usually encompassed by a simplified drum sequence and a buzzsaw synth turned up to the red and repeated long enough for DJs to make their paycheck" and wrote "the band has a knack of elongating their elementally good ideas into preposterously tiresome compositions."

Commercial performance 
The album debuted at number six on the Billboard 200 chart, with first-week sales of 119,000 copies in the United States. It is their third album to chart inside the top ten, but their lowest charting album since Elephunk, which peaked at number 14 in 2003. As of October 2011, the album had sold over 800,000 copies in the United States.

In the United Kingdom, the album debuted at number 17 selling 34,006 copies. After a performance on The X Factor on December 5, 2010, the album rose eight places to number nine and subsequently spent three weeks in the top ten. In Canada, it debuted at number two selling 27,400 copies in its first week, being kept off the top spot by a margin of 200 copies behind Susan Boyle's The Gift. The album debuted at number one in France, selling 35,653 copies in its first week. It is the Black Eyed Peas' third consecutive number-one album in the country.

In Germany, the album debuted at number five and started to slowly fall down. In its third week, the album was at No. 9 but could jump to No. 7 the following week. Following the success of the single "The Time (Dirty Bit)", the album rose from No. 7 to No. 2 in its fifth week, the album's peak position.

Track listing 

Notes
 signifies a co-producer
"The Time (Dirty Bit)" interpolates "(I've Had) The Time of My Life," originally performed by Bill Medley and Jennifer Warnes in the 1987 film Dirty Dancing.
"Light Up the Night" contains a sample of "Children's Story" by Slick Rick.
"Fashion Beats" contains a sample of "My Forbidden Lover" by Chic.
"Love You Long Time" contains a sample of "Give It Up" by KC and the Sunshine Band.

Personnel
Credits for The Beginning adapted from Allmusic.

 Stacy Ferguson – vocals
 William Adams – vocals, art direction, bass,  drum programming, engineer, executive producer, Fender Rhodes, logo design, Moog bass, producer, synthesizer
 DJ Ammo – drum programming, Moog bass, producer, synthesizer
 Michelle Bishop – violin
 Davis Barnett – viola
 Larry Gold – conductor, string arrangements
 Jaime Gomez (Taboo) – vocals, 
 David Guetta –  drum programming, producer, synthesizer
 Keith Harris –  Fender Rhodes, grand piano, piano, synthesizer
 Alain Whyte – guitar
 Josh Lopez – guitar
 Caleb Speir – bass
 Giorgio Tuinfort –  drum programming, producer, synthesizer
 Ghislaine Fleischmann – violin
 Ruth Frazier – viola
 Olga Konopelsky – violin
 Tom Kraines – cello
 Emma Kummrow – violin
 Tamae Lee – violin
 Erica Miller – violin
 Charles Parker – violin
 Gregory Teperman – violin
 Jennie Lorenzo – cello
 Deborah Mannis - Gardner – sample clearance
 Allan Pineda – vocals
 Eddie Axley – logo design
 Chris Bellman – mastering
 Jennifer Bowling – marketing coordinator
 Dennis Dennehy – publicity
 William Derella – management
 Dylan Dresdow – mixing
 Free School – producer
 Julie Hovsepian – product manager
 Tomoko Itoki – marketing
 Neil Jacobson – A&R
 Justin Franks (DJ Frank E) – producer
 Rodney "Darkchild" Jerkins – producer
 Andy Kalyvas – mastering assistant
 Jonathan Levine – booking
 Polo Molina – management
 Huan Nghiem – art direction
 Padraic 'Padlock' Kerin – engineer, production coordination
 Brenda Reynoso – publicity
 Dante Santiago – A&R
 James Durkin – recording assistant
 Pasha Shapiro – art direction
 Hillary Siskind – publicity
 David Sonenberg – management
 Anthony Taglianetti – mixing assistant
 Scott Thomas – booking
 Andrew Van Meter – producer
 Jorge Velasco – mixing assistant
 Ernst Weber – art direction
 Ianthe Zevos – creation

Charts

Weekly charts

Year-end charts

Certifications

Release history

References

External links 
 The Beginning at Metacritic

2010 albums
Albums produced by David Guetta
Albums produced by Free School
Albums produced by Rodney Jerkins
Albums produced by will.i.am
Alternative hip hop albums by American artists
Techno albums by American artists
Black Eyed Peas albums
Interscope Records albums
Universal Records albums
A&M Records albums
Interscope Geffen A&M Records albums